Dalia Koriat (born 5 November 1969) is an Israeli former professional tennis player.

Active on tour in the 1980s, Koriat was a product of Israel Tennis Centers. She won the Eddie Herr Junior Championships in 1987. As a member of the Israel Federation Cup team she featured in a total of five ties, for three singles and two doubles wins. In 1989 she won a silver medal in women's doubles at the Maccabiah Games.

ITF finals

Singles: 4 (0–4)

Doubles: 2 (2–2)

See also
List of Israel Fed Cup team representatives

References

External links
 
 
 

1969 births
Living people
Israeli female tennis players
Competitors at the 1989 Maccabiah Games
Maccabiah Games silver medalists for Israel
Maccabiah Games medalists in tennis